Filmer Honywood (c. 1745 – 2 June 1809) was an English politician who sat in the House of Commons at various times between 1774 and 1806.

Honywood was the son of Sir John Honywood, 3rd Baronet and his second wife Dorothy Filmer, daughter of Sir Edward Filmer, 3rd Baronet.

Honywood was elected Member of Parliament (MP) for Steyning in 1774 and held the seat until 1780. He was elected MP for Kent in 1780 and held the seat until 1796. He was re-elected MP for Kent in 1802 and held the seat until 1806.

Honywood lived at Hull Place in Ottenden and in 1785 inherited Marks Hall, Essex from General Philip Honywood. He died unmarried, and the estate passed to his half-nephew William Honywood.

References

External links

1809 deaths
1740s births
Members of the Parliament of Great Britain for English constituencies
British MPs 1780–1784
British MPs 1784–1790
British MPs 1790–1796
Members of the Parliament of the United Kingdom for English constituencies
UK MPs 1802–1806